Karl Wazulek (December 13, 1914 – March 10, 1958) was an Austrian speed skater who competed in the 1936 Winter Olympics. He finished sixth in the 1500 metres competition, eighth in the 5000 metres event, eleventh in the 10000 metres competition, and 13th in the 500 metres event.

References

External links
 Speed skating 1936 
 

1914 births
1958 deaths
Austrian male speed skaters
Olympic speed skaters of Austria
Speed skaters at the 1936 Winter Olympics
World Allround Speed Skating Championships medalists
20th-century Austrian people